Chertsey Rural District was a rural district in Surrey, England from 1894 to 1933.

The rural district was the successor to the Chertsey Rural Sanitary District and originally comprised seven civil parishes. It did not include the town of Chertsey, which was an urban district in its own right. The district was reduced in size in 1907 and 1909 with the loss of two parishes to urban districts and finally abolished in 1933 when its constituent parishes were transferred to other districts under a county review order.

The rural district as originally constituted, was in three parts, separated by other districts. The four parishes of Bisley, Chobham, Horsall and Windlesham formed a single block while the parish of Thorpe was a detached portion to the north-east and the parishes of Byfleet and Pyrford formed another detached block to the south-east.

References

External links 

1933 disestablishments in England
Districts of England created by the Local Government Act 1894
Rural districts of England